Ferdinando di Diano da Diano (about 1571 - 17th century), also known as Donatus Polienus, was an Italian mathematician, abbot, philosopher, and theologist.

He wrote at least 15 works about different topics, from religious history to natural science.

Life 
Born in Siderno, Calabria, Di Diano was active as philosopher in Liguria around 1630.

Works 

Fiume dell'origine della lingua italiana et latina (1626)

References 

16th-century Italian mathematicians
17th-century Italian mathematicians
Italian abbots
1570s births
17th-century deaths
17th-century Italian Roman Catholic theologians
16th-century Italian Roman Catholic theologians